= Uzuaba =

Village in Imo state, Nigeria

Uzuaba is a village in southeastern Nigeria. It is located near the city of Owerri.
